Jan Petrus Leonardus Janssen (born October 17, 1952) is a former professional ice hockey player.  Of Dutch descent, he played several years for Dutch club Heerenveen Flyers as well as for the Netherlands national ice hockey team. He was born in Chicago Heights, Illinois.

A forward, Janssen played a total of 12 seasons with Heerenveen between 1975 and 1987.  His best points total for a season came in 1978-9 when he collected 75 points in 43 games.

Janssen played the 1980 Winter Olympics and 1981 World Ice Hockey Championships for the Dutch, the only two times that the national side played in the top tier internationally.  He had 3 assists in the 5 games the Netherlands played.  At the 1981 World Championship he had a goal and two assists in 8 games.

References

External links

1952 births
American men's ice hockey forwards
American people of Dutch descent
Dutch ice hockey right wingers
Heerenveen Flyers players
Ice hockey players from Illinois
Ice hockey players at the 1980 Winter Olympics
Living people
Olympic ice hockey players of the Netherlands
People from Chicago Heights, Illinois
Saint Mary's University of Minnesota alumni
Sportspeople from Cook County, Illinois